St Peter's Church, Spring Hill is a Grade B listed former Church of England parish church in Birmingham.

History

The first church dedicated to St Peter in Birmingham was built in Dale End and consecrated in 1827. This was closed in 1899 for demolition and the endowments transferred to a new church. The new church was built to designs by the architect Frank Barlow Osborn and was consecrated on Saturday 19 July 1902 by the Bishop of Worcester. A parish was assigned in 1902 from the parishes of All Saints' Church, Hockley and St Mark's Church, Ladywood.

When the church was closed in 2001 by the Church of England the parish merged with St John's Church, Ladywood and the building was sold to become the New Testament Church of God the Rock.  It was registered with this name in January 2004.

References

Church of England church buildings in Birmingham, West Midlands
Churches completed in 1902
Former Church of England church buildings
Ladywood